Boothwyn is a census-designated place (CDP) in Delaware County, Pennsylvania, United States. The population was 4,933 at the 2010 census, down from 5,206 at the 2000 census. The census estimation for population circa 2019 is 6,115.

History
The Chichester Friends Meeting, which was organized in 1682, with the current building constructed in 1769,  is listed on the National Register of Historic Places.  Bill Haley, who pioneered Rock n' Roll with Bill Haley & His Comets, was a long-time resident of Boothwyn.

Local Favorite and Pennsylvania Amish Market "Booth's Corner" is within the Bounds of Boothwyn, built at the corner of the old land holdings of Edwin Booth, who gives the building and Boothwyn its name.

Geography
Boothwyn is located in southwestern Delaware County at  (39.835115, -75.444507), in the southern part of Upper Chichester Township. The CDP contains the unincorporated communities of Boothwyn (southern part of the CDP) and Gardendale (northern part).

The Boothwyn, Reliance, and Ogden fire companies are located in Boothwyn.

Educational system
Boothwyn is a part of Chichester School District. Children within the area usually attend  Boothwyn Elementary School or Hilltop School (Grades K-4),  Chichester Middle School (Grades 5-8), or Chichester High School (Grades 9-12).

Holy Family Regional Catholic School in Aston, of the Roman Catholic Archdiocese of Philadelphia, is the area Catholic school. It formed in 2012 from a merger of Holy Savior-St. John Fisher Elementary School in Linwood and St. Joseph Catholic School in Aston. Holy Savior School opened in 1917, and changed its name after St. John Fisher Church was established in Boothwyn in 1971 as the school at that time became the parish school of St. John Fisher.

Demographics
As of the census of 2000, there were 5,206 people, 2,047 households, and 1,367 families residing in the CDP. The population density was 4,236.1 people per square mile (1,634.2/km). There were 2,126 housing units at an average density of 1,729.9/sq mi (667.4/km). The racial makeup of the CDP was 80.70% White, 6.13% African American, 0.10% Native American, 1.67% Asian, 0.02% Pacific Islander, 0.40% from other races, and 0.98% from two or more races. Hispanic or Latino of any race were 10.11% of the population.

There were 2,047 households, out of which 29.0% had children under the age of 18 living with them, 49.6% were married couples living together, 12.7% had a female householder with no husband present, and 33.2% were non-families. 26.4% of all households were made up of individuals, and 9.2% had someone living alone who was 65 years of age or older. The average household size was 2.54 and the average family size was 3.12.

In the CDP, the population was spread out, with 22.7% under the age of 18, 9.0% from 18 to 24, 31.8% from 25 to 44, 23.7% from 45 to 64, and 12.8% who were 65 years of age or older. The median age was 37 years. For every 100 females, there were 91.6 males. For every 100 females age 18 and over, there were 89.3 males.

The median income for a household in the CDP was $46,433, and the median income for a family was $60,096. Males had a median income of $41,793 versus $29,962 for females. The per capita income for the CDP was $23,811. About 6.7% of families and 6.2% of the population were below the poverty line, including 9.2% of those under age 18 and 7.1% of those age 65 or over.

Notable people
Bill Haley, Rock and Roll musician
Billy "White Shoes" Johnson, NFL player

References

Census-designated places in Delaware County, Pennsylvania
Census-designated places in Pennsylvania